This is a list of electoral results for the Electoral district of Beeloo in Western Australian state elections.

Members for Beeloo

Election results

Elections in the 1960s

 Two party preferred vote was estimated.

Elections in the 1950s 

 Two party preferred vote was estimated.

References

Western Australian state electoral results by district